Blank Canvas is a 2009 documentary film about the creation of 'We Unfold', a contemporary dance work. The film was directed by Tim Slade and features Spanish-born choreographer Rafael Bonachela and the Sydney Dance Company.

The film was made as Rafael Bonachela began his tenure at the helm of the company, after a period of instability due to the departure of long time Artistic Director Graeme Murphy and the sudden death of Tanja Liedtke, who was about to begin as his successor. The film touches on this transitional period, but structures itself around the chronological creation of the 'We Unfold', as well as around the movements of the musical composition on which it is based, the Symphony No.1 'Oceans' for cello and orchestra by Italian composer Ezio Bosso.

Bonachela's strong personality and dynamism is at the heart of the film; and his journey from a small Spanish town, through studies in Spain and London, working with Rambert Dance Company, the singer Kylie Minogue and finally as the leader of his own company is a story marked with conviction and dedication.

The film was positively received on its first broadcasts in late 2009  and has screened in Europe, the UK and Australia as well as being commercially available in the United States.

References

External links

2009 films
2009 documentary films
Australian documentary films
Documentary films about modern dance
2000s English-language films